Witold Bardach (July 26, 1925 – May 10, 2016), better known as Gene Gutowski, was a Polish-American film producer who produced many of Roman Polanski's films, including  Repulsion (1965), Cul-de-Sac (1966), The Fearless Vampire Killers (1967), and The Pianist (2002).

Biography

Early life
Gutowski was born as Witold Bardach in Lwow (then Poland; now Ukraine) in 1925, the son of Juliusz Bardach (lawyer) and Anna Bardach née Garfunkel (concert pianist). From 1933 until the beginning of the war in 1939, the Bardach family lived in Rawa Ruska; then, moved to Lwow, where under Soviet occupation Witold began his studies as sculptor at the Institute of Fine Arts under Prof. Marian Wnuk. In 1941 the Germans occupied Lwow and a year later his entire family, who had lived there for generations, was killed.

Bardach escaped to Warsaw where he first worked for a photographer and later as an employee of the Junkers factory at Okecie Airport (Warsaw Chopin Airport), secretly removing Luftwaffe radio-transmitters for delivery to the underground Home Army (Armia Krajowa). In order to escape from the Gestapo at 18 years old, he took on the name “Eugene (Eugeniusz) Gutowski” and left Warsaw for Riga, Latvia where he became the head of a construction company working for the Organization Todt. He was later evacuated to Germany via Baltic Sea, Gdańsk, Silesia to Judenburg in today’s Austria at the end of 1944. At the end of the war in May 1945, again escaping from the advancing Soviet army, Gutowski joined the Counterintelligence Corps (United States Army). He worked as a special agent until March 1947 when he married the U.S. State Department employee, Zillah Rhoades, and moved with her to New York City. They had two children, Arch. Ing. Andrew Gutowski, born in New York on July 17, 1951, and Captain Alexander Waugh Gutowski, born in Charlottesville, Virginia on November 7, 1952. Captain Alexander Waugh Gutowski had one child, Jordan Waugh, born in Saskatchewan, Canada September 17, 1979.

Film career
After working for a few years as fashion illustrator, Gene Gutowski entered the film and TV industry, working as a production manager on a couple of episodes of the mid-1950s TV series I Spy which featured Raymond Massey in the lead role. He moved to London in 1960 to produce Station Six Sahara released in 1962. It was there that he joined forces with Roman Polanski in 1963. In a fruitful creative partnership they made Repulsion (1965), Cul-de-sac (1966) and The Fearless Vampire Killers (1967), until Polanski moved to Hollywood under contract to Paramount in 1967. In 1970 Gutowski wrote the script for and produced The Adventures of Gerard, directed by Jerzy Skolimowski, and then produced A Day at the Beach (1970), a picture directed by a newcomer but written by Polanski, and Romance of a Horsethief (1971). Remaining close friends over the years, Gutowski and Polanski joined forces again to produce together The Pianist (2002), which won multiple Oscars. Gutowski staged several plays, including Passion Flower Hotel (1965), Death and the Maiden (1992) and Doubt: A Parable (2007).

In 2004, his Polish autobiography Od Holocaustu do Hollywood (From Holocaust to Hollywood), was published. An English-language edition under the title With Balls and Chutzpah: A Story of Survival was issued in the U.S. in 2011. In 2014, his son, the Hollywood-based filmmaker/producer Adam Bardach, made a documentary biopic "Dancing Before the Enemy: How a Teenage Boy Fooled the Nazis and Lived (Mój tata Gene Gutowski)".

Filmography 
 Station Six-Sahara (1962) Executive Producer
 Repulsion (1965) Producer
 Cul-de-sac (1966) Producer
 The Fearless Vampire Killers (1967) Producer
 The Adventures of Gerard (1970) Writer/Producer
 A Day at the Beach (1970) Producer
 Romance of a Horsethief (1971) Producer
 The Pianist (2002) Co-Producer
 Doubt: A Parable (2007 stage play) Producer

References

External links

Polish emigrants to the United States
Polish film producers
20th-century Polish Jews
American film producers
2016 deaths
1925 births
Film people from Lviv